Salisbury station is an Amtrak station located in Salisbury, North Carolina. The street address is Depot and Liberty Streets, and is located in the Salisbury Railroad Corridor Historic District.

History
The station was constructed in 1908 by the Southern Railway and was designed by Frank P. Milburn in the Spanish Mission Style. It was added to the National Register of Historic Places in 1975, but was nearly demolished until it was bought by the Historic Salisbury Foundation in 1984. Renovations began in 1993 and were completed by 1996, although NCDOT gave the foundation extra funding in 1999 to enlarge the waiting room.

References

External links 

Salisbury Station – NC By Train
Salisbury Amtrak Station (USA Rail Guide -- Train Web)

Stations along Southern Railway lines in the United States
Amtrak stations in North Carolina
Railway stations on the National Register of Historic Places in North Carolina
Buildings and structures in Salisbury, North Carolina
Railway stations in the United States opened in 1908
Frank Pierce Milburn buildings
Transportation in Rowan County, North Carolina
National Register of Historic Places in Rowan County, North Carolina
Historic district contributing properties in North Carolina
1908 establishments in North Carolina